This is a list of government ministries of Brunei. Ministries are the primary executive branches of the Government of Brunei. There are thirteen ministries, which include:
 Prime Minister's Office
 Ministry of Finance and Economy
 Ministry of Defence
 Ministry of Foreign Affairs
 Ministry of Home Affairs
 Ministry of Education
 Ministry of Energy
 Ministry of Primary Resources and Tourism
 Ministry of Development
 Ministry of Culture, Youth and Sports
 Ministry of Health
 Ministry of Religious Affairs
 Ministry of Transport and Infocommunications

See also 
 Cabinet of Brunei

References 

 
Lists of government ministries